The 1969–70 Toronto Maple Leafs season was the 53rd season of play of the NHL Toronto franchise and 43rd as the Maple Leafs. After qualifying for the playoffs the previous season, the Leafs fell to last-place in the NHL East and did not qualify for the playoffs, marking the first time since 1958 that the club endured a last place finish.

Offseason
Punch Imlach's term as Maple Leafs' general manager ended after the 1969 playoffs. Jim Gregory, who had been an executive with the Toronto Marlboros was named general manager, the first new GM for the Maple Leafs since 1957.

NHL Draft

Regular season

Season standings

Schedule and results

Player statistics

Regular season
Scoring

Goaltending

Playoffs
 The Maple Leafs did not qualify for the postseason

Transactions
The Maple Leafs have been involved in the following transactions during the 1969–70 season.

Trades

Intra-League Draft

Reverse Draft

Expansion Draft

Free agents

Awards and records

Farm teams

References
 Maple Leafs on Hockey Database

Toronto Maple Leafs seasons
Toronto Maple Leafs season, 1969-70
Tor